Iaroslav Denysenko (Yaroslav Yuriyovych Denysenko, ; born 23 September 1991) is a swimmer from Ukraine who competes in Paralympic S13, SB13 and SM13 (individual medley) events. 
A five time European champion, in 2013 Denysenko won the World Championship in 50 metres freestyle S13, and has appeared in two Paralympic Games

Career history
Denysenko began swimming competitively in 2013 for Ukraine, winning the world title in his debut season. He came to international attention when he competed at the 2016 Paralympic Games, winning four silver medals.

The following year Denysenko represented Ukraine again, winning 5 gold and two silver medals at the 2018 World Para Swimming European Championships, dominating the S12 classification.

Personal life
In recognition of his performance at the 2016 Paralympic Games in Rio de Janeiro, he received the Order for Merits [second grade] in Ukraine. He has also received the title of Honoured Master of Sport in Ukraine. 
His wife Kateryna Denysenko [Istomina] has competed in Para swimming, winning gold in the S8 100m butterfly at the 2016 Paralympic Games in Rio de Janeiro.

References

External links
  
 

1991 births
Living people
Ukrainian male swimmers
Paralympic swimmers of Ukraine
S13-classified Paralympic swimmers
Medalists at the 2016 Summer Paralympics
Swimmers at the 2016 Summer Paralympics
Medalists at the World Para Swimming Championships
Medalists at the World Para Swimming European Championships
Paralympic medalists in swimming
Paralympic silver medalists for Ukraine
Sportspeople from Poltava
21st-century Ukrainian people